Pallonji Shapoorji Mistry (1 June 1929 – 28 June 2022) was an Indian-born Irish billionaire construction tycoon. He was chairman of the Shapoorji Pallonji Group and a major shareholder of India's largest private conglomerate, Tata Group. He was one of the world's wealthiest people.

Early life
Pallonji Mistry was born to Shapoorji Mistry in Bombay (now Mumbai) on 1 June 1929. He was a member of Parsi community in Bombay.

The Mistrys own a substantial construction company, Shapoorji Pallonji. Shapoorji, the group patriarch and Pallonji's father, built some of Mumbai's landmarks around the Fort area – the Hong Kong & Shanghai Bank, the Grindlays Bank, the Standard Chartered Bank, the State Bank of India and the Reserve Bank of India buildings.

Career
His father first bought shares in Tata Sons in the 1930s, a stake that as of 2011 stood at 18.4%, making Mistry the largest individual shareholder in Tata Sons,  which is primarily controlled by the Tata philanthropic Allied Trusts, and the largest individual shareholder in India's largest private conglomerate, Tata Group, the primary shareholder being the charitable Tata Trusts. 

Pallonji Mistry was the chairman of the Shapoorji Pallonji Group, through which he owned Shapoorji Pallonji Construction Limited, Forbes Textiles and Eureka Forbes Limited. He was the former chairman of Associated Cement Companies.

His son, Cyrus, was chairman of Tata Sons from November 2011 to October 2016. Within the Tata Group, he is known as the Phantom of Bombay House for the quiet but assured way he commanded power around the Mumbai headquarters of the Tata empire.

According to Bloomberg Billionaires Index, Pallonji Mistry's wealth was estimated to be about US$30 Billion in mid-2021. and US$29 billion at the time of his death. He was the richest Irish billionaire at the time of his death, and the world's 143 richest person.

Personal life and death
In 2003, Pallonji gave up his Indian citizenship to become an Irish citizen "on the basis of his marriage to an Irish-born national", Pat "Patsy" Perin Dubash, who was born in September 1939 at Hatch Street Nursing House in Dublin. He remained in residence in Mumbai. The family's interest in Ireland is ascribed, in part, to their love of horses; Mistry owned a  stud farm and a  home in Pune, India.

Mistry has two sons and two daughters. His elder son, Shapoor Mistry (b. 1964), runs the Shapoorji Pallonji group, while his younger son, the late Cyrus Mistry (1968—2022), served for some years as chairman of the Tata group. Mistry's elder daughter is Laila and his younger daughter, Aloo, is married to Noel Tata, half-brother of Ratan Tata. 

He was awarded the Padma Bhushan in January 2016 by the Government of India for his contributions in the field of trade and industry.

A short biography of Mistry was written in a 2008 book by Manoj Namburu titled The Moguls of Real Estate.

Mistry died in Mumbai on 28 June 2022 at the age of 93.

References

Further reading
 A section of the Tata family Tree
 Information about holding by Pallonji in Tata sons

1929 births
2022 deaths
Cathedral and John Connon School alumni
Irish chief executives
Irish expatriates in India
Irish people of Indian descent
Irish Zoroastrians
Irish billionaires
Parsi people from Mumbai
Recipients of the Padma Bhushan in trade and industry
Naturalised citizens of Ireland
Parsi people
Pallonji
Shapoorji Pallonji Group